Vive la Historia (English: Live the history) is a live album by Mexican pop singer Yuri. It was released in 2007. It sold more than 100,000 earning Gold and Platinum disc.

Reception
In 2007, Yuri released "Vive la Historia" that consisted of her first live package of DVD and CD of her greatest hits, reaching Gold disc regardless of not being promoted and no single releases. Shortly thereafter, a "Fan Edition" was released. This helped the album reach platinum.

Track listing
Tracks:
 Intro Hola
 Hola
 Todo mi corazón
 Hombres al borde de un ataque de celos
 Detrás de mi ventana
 ¿Qué Te Pasa?
 Medley baladas 1
 Cuando baja la marea
 Intro Maldita Primavera
 Maldita Primavera
 Medley Baladas 2
 Intro El Apagón
 El Apagón
 Medley 80's

De Luxe Edition
Tracks:

CD 1
 Intro Hola
 Hola
 Todo mi corazón
 Hombres al borde de un ataque de celos
 Amiga mía
 Detrás de mi ventana
 ¿Qué Te Pasa?
 Medley baladas 1
 Intro Sabes lo que pasa
 Sabes lo que pasa
 Y llegaste tú
 Cuando baja la marea

CD 2
 De qué te vale fingir
 Intro Maldita Primavera
 Maldita Primavera
 Medley Baladas 2
 El Espejo
 Intro El Apagón
 El Apagón
 Medley 80's

DVD
 Menu Loop 'Vive La Historia'
 Intro Hola
 Hola
 Todo mi Corazón
 Hombres al Borde de un Ataque de Celos
 Amiga Mia
 Detrás De Mi Ventana
 ¿Qué Te Pasa?
 Medley Baladas 1
 Intro Sabes Lo Que Pasa
 Sabes Lo Que Pasa
 Y Llegaste Tú
 Cuando Baja La Marea
 De Que Te Vale Fingir
 Intro Maldita Primavera
 Maldita Primavera
 Medley Baladas 2
 El Espejo
 Intro El Apagón
 El Apagón
 Medley 80's
 Detrás Del Maquillaje
 Photogallery 'Vive La Historia'

References

Yuri (Mexican singer) albums
2007 live albums
2007 video albums
Live video albums